Banyawol Station is a station of the Daegu Subway Line 1 in Seoho-dong and Dongho-dong, Dong District, Daegu, South Korea.
It is connected with the last stop of the downtown bus. Its use frequently is reportedly low.

References

External links 
 DTRO virtual station 

Dong District, Daegu
Daegu Metro stations
Railway stations opened in 1998